Edmore may refer to a location in the United States:

 Edmore, Michigan
 Edmore, North Dakota